Keg-tossing (or keg toss or weight over bar) is a sport that involves the heaving of a standard 15.5 gallon beer keg. Most people would refer to this type of keg as a "half-keg" or "half-barrel." The keg must be completely emptied before it should be tossed to avoid injuries. There are many different types of keg-tossing, as it is practiced throughout the world. In Ireland, the keg is typically thrown over upwards and the height of the toss determines the winner.

The newest way to toss a keg combines techniques of both the discus and hammer throw. This updated form of keg-tossing does not require the athlete to toss the keg high, rather they are required to try to throw it the farthest distance. Athletes are given three attempts to throw the keg and the winner is determined by measuring the distance tossed. The one who throws the keg the furthest wins.

The basic technique for tossing the keg involves swinging the keg in a pendulum like manner and releasing the keg when it is at its apex. A more experienced athlete uses a spin method similar to a hammer throw. The keg is again released when it is at its apex, allowing for the maximum distance.

Strongman competitions
In competitive strongman competitions, several variations of the traditional event has been used throughout the years. In 1980 World's Strongest Man, 'weight over bar' event was introduced where the competitors had to throw a 25.5 kg (56 lb) weight derived from the legendary Highland games using only 1 arm for max height over a bar (A heavy block of iron is attached to a fixed small ring which itself is attached to a freely moving large ring, used to grip the weight. The weight was derived from the imperial unit Stone, where a weight of 4 stones (1 stone = 14 lb) was used as a counterbalance for weight measurements when buying or selling in the ancient Scottish markets). In 1992 World's Strongest Man, the competitors had to throw a 30 kg (66 lb) Thor's hammer but this time using both arms for max height. In 1993 World's Strongest Man, the competitors had to throw a 20 kg (44 lb) concrete block over a contraption which was called the Trojan wall again for a max height. In 2010 World's Strongest Man, the competitors had to throw 8 beer kegs of increasing weights ranging from 17-24 kg over a 4 meter bar in the fastest time. At the 2017 Arnold Strongman Classic, the competitors had to throw very heavy sandbags over a 15 ft bar for max weight. In all of the variations, the weights are thrown overhead and to the rear of the thrower, and must be thrown over the top of the bar.

World Records
Max height/ Max weight

Speed 
 Keg toss – 8 kegs (18–25 kg) over  bar in 15.71 seconds by Žydrūnas Savickas  (2013) 
 Keg toss – 8 kegs (18–25 kg) over  bar in 16.35 seconds by Hafþór Júlíus Björnsson  (2014)

References

https://www.foxsports.com/ohio/video/1270467651836
Games of physical skill
Individual sports
Throwing sports